Physiographic macroregions of China is a term suggested by an American anthropologist G. William Skinner as a subdivision of China Proper into nine areas according to the drainage basins of the major rivers and other travel-constraining geomorphological features. They are distinct in terms of environment, economic resources, culture and more or less interdependent histories with often unsynchronized developmental macrocycles. They were described in Skinner's landmark essays in  The City in Late Imperial China.

19th century 
Skinner and his school maintain that prior to modernization, transportation was largely constrained by terrain and the physiographic macroregions are a close approximation for the socioeconomic macroregions of 19th-century China. The macroregions are defined by Skinner as follows:
10 Northeast China, 东北区 
20 North China, 华北区
30 Northwest China 西北区
 Wei-Fen Basins  渭汾流域分区
 Upper Yellow River Basin  黄河上游分区
Gansu Corridor  河西(甘肃)走廊分区
40 Upper Yangtze 长江上游区
50 Middle Yangtze 长江中游区
 Middle Yangtze proper 长江中游分区
 Gan Basin  赣江流域分区
 Yuan Basin  沅江流域分区
 Upper Han Basin  汉江上游分区
60 Lower Yangtze 长江下游区
70 Southeast Coast 东南沿海区 (approximately Fujian, eastern part of Guangdong, southern part of Zhejiang, and Taiwan)
 Ou-Ling River Basins  瓯灵流域分区
Min River Basin   闽江流域分区
Zhang-Quan   漳泉分区 (Zhangzhou plus Quanzhou)
Han Basin  韩江流域分区
 Taiwan   台湾分区
 80 Lingnan 岭南区, which may be translated as "South of Mountains". It includes the Southern coast and nearly  coincides with the two entities: province of Guangdong and Guangxi autonomous region, together traditionally called "Two Guang provinces", or Liangguang. 
 90 Yungui 云贵区; covers most of Yunnan Province  and larger part of Guizhou Province and corresponds to the Yungui Plateau.

Modern provinces of Xinjiang, Tibet, Qinghai and a larger part of Inner Mongolia are not considered by Skinner's scheme.

20th century 
According to Skinner's analysis, the 20th century China excluding Inner Asia has 9 socioeconomic macroregions with cores not changed from the physiographic ones of the 19th century, but with changed territorial extents.

See also
Regions of China
Administrative divisions of China
 Geography of China#History
 Regional Religious System - an approach to the study of Chinese religion based on Skinner's research

External links
 China Historical GIS Project
  GIS Shapefile format

References

Regions of China